Eric Kelso (born December 22, 1962) is an American voice actor, director, presenter and producer currently based in Tokyo, Japan.

He is best known as the voice of Paul Phoenix in the video game series, Tekken, as well as Guizhang Chen, Masayuki Fukuhara, and Ren of Heavens in the Shenmue series, Captain Falcon, and Blood Falcon in F-Zero GX, and Jacky Bryant in the Virtua Fighter series. Outside of video games, he has also provided voices for many Japanese TV shows, films, radio programs.

Early life 
Eric Kelso was born and raised in San Jose, California. He attended high school in Santa Cruz and went to the University of California at Santa Barbara where he majored in Film Studies. While at UCSB he received a Corwin Metropolitan Film Award for writing and directing the short film, "an echo en route".

After graduating in 1986, he set out to travel the world in search of documentary film subjects. He eventually made his way to his current long-time residence of Japan.

Career

Narration 
Kelso has been active in Japan doing English-language and Japanese-language voiceovers for movies, television shows, children's programs and educational broadcasting. In 1995, Kelso provided live interactive voiceover and CG movement work for Mr. Mike, a sarcastic talking microphone character, around the world. Notable events include TELECOM 95 in Geneva, Switzerland, as well as at ASIA TELECOM 97 in Singapore.

He voiced the Japanese movie trailer for Disney's Mulan, as well as the part of River Guide in the Wild River Splash VR Simulator ride for DreamWorks at SEGA's Joypolis in Tokyo. In 2006, shortly after the merger of Tomy and Takara, Kelso provided the voice for the Omnibot 2007: i-SOBOT, which has been certified by Guinness World Records as "the world's smallest humanoid robot in production".

Kelso has been a director and producer for corporate video recordings for companies such as Prologis Inc. and Medtronic.

Voice acting 
Kelso began voice acting for the video game industry in 1996. In 2001, he voiced the character Paul Phoenix in the fighting video game, Tekken 4. In 2004, Kelso reprised this role in 5 and continued to voice the character in Dark Resurrection and 6.

In 2000, Kelso provided voices for the English dub of the Sega Dreamcast game, Shenmue. Playing the roles of Masayuki Fukuhara and Guizhang Chen, Kelso noted how expansive the project was, having a more developed storyline and more dialogue than other games at the time. In 2001, Kelso became the voice for another fighting game character in Virtua Fighter 4 called Jacky Bryant. He also reprised the role in Virtua Fighter 5, as well as side projects featuring the character, such as, Sega Superstars, Virtua Quest, Sonic & Sega All-Stars Racing, and Dead or Alive 5 Ultimate In 2002, Kelso also worked on the sequel to Shenmue, Shenmue II, voicing a new character in the franchise, Wuying Ren "of Heavens". The English dub of the game appeared in the re-released version on the Microsoft Xbox console as well as the high-definition ports for Microsoft Windows, PlayStation 4 and Xbox One.

Filmography

Television

Film

Video games

Radio

Narration

Other voice work

References

External links 
Official website

1962 births
20th-century American male actors
21st-century American male actors
American directors
American expatriates in Japan
American male video game actors
American male voice actors
Living people
Male actors from San Jose, California